Judd Bernard (born Sherman Bernard Goldberg; June 20, 1927 – January 25, 2022) was an American film producer and screenwriter. Bernard died on January 25, 2022, at the age of 94.

Filmography
Producer
 Blood Red (1989)
 The Class of Miss MacMichael (1978)
 Inside Out (1975)
 The Marseille Contract (1974) 
 The Man Who Had Power Over Women (1970)
 Deep End (1970)
 Negatives (1968)
 Blue (1968)
 Fade-In (1968) (TV)
 Point Blank (1967)
 Double Trouble (1967)

Writer
 The Class of Miss MacMichael (1978)
 Inside Out (1975)
 The Marseille Contract (1974)

References

External links

1927 births
2022 deaths
Place of birth missing
21st-century American Jews
American film producers
American male screenwriters
Jewish American screenwriters